Tabor Academy may refer to:

Tabor Academy, Braintree, a secondary school in Braintree, Essex, England
Tabor Academy (Massachusetts), a college preparatory school in  Marion, Massachusetts, United States

See also
Tabor (disambiguation)